Nassau Bay is a city in Harris County, Texas, United States, bordering the outermost southeastern edge of the city of Houston. It is located in the Clear Lake Area near Galveston Bay, directly adjacent to the Lyndon B. Johnson Space Center. The population was 5,347 at the 2020 census.

History

Colonel Raymond Pearson established the Spirit of 1776 Ranch on what would become Nassau Bay. In 1962, a community was planned which would be an exclusive residential and commercial area emphasizing its pioneers and at a then-staggering cost of $49 million. In 1962 construction of Nassau Bay began and the first residents moved to Nassau Bay in 1964; its initial population was 400. It was developed by Ernest W. Roe Company, with Thompson McCleary of Caudill, Rowlett, and Scott providing architectural services and Nassau Bay Development Associates establishing the development. The name was chosen by the  developers because of the tropical feeling it generated. At the time, NASA was moving personnel from several areas in the United States with a high quality of life, including California and, notably, Florida.

In 1968 the community had 2,979 residents. The city incorporated in 1970. The population was 6,702 in 1980, 4,526 in 1982, 4,506 in 1991, and 4,170 in 2000.

Geography

Nassau Bay is located in southeastern Harris County at  (29.544463, –95.089558). It is bordered to the west by the city of Webster, and to the north by the city of Houston. It is bordered to the south by Clear Creek and to the southeast by the head of Clear Lake, an arm of Galveston Bay. Across the creek and lake, Nassau Bay is bordered by League City in Galveston County.

It is adjacent to the Johnson Space Center (JSC), which lies on the other side of Texas State Highway NASA Road 1 within the Houston city limits. Carlton Bayou, Clear Lake, and Swan Lagoon serve as boundaries of the community.

Demographics

As of the 2020 United States census, there were 5,347 people, 1,890 households, and 1,014 families residing in the city. As of the census of 2000, there were 4,170 people, 2,049 households, and 1,213 families residing in the city. The population density was 3,146.0 people per square mile (1,210.6/km). There were 2,243 housing units at an average density of 1,692.2 per square mile (651.1/km).

According to the 2000 U.S. census, the racial makeup of the city was 89.64% White, 3.91% Asian, 2.23% of multi-racial background, 1.87% African American,1.68% from other races, 0.50% Native American, and 0.17% Pacific Islander. Hispanic or Latino of any race accounted for 6.28% of the population. By 2020, the racial and ethnic makeup was 63.83% non-Hispanic white, 6.35% African American, 0.34% Native American, 4.28% Asian, 0.04% Pacific Islander, 0.3% some other race, 4.15% multiracial, and 20.7% Hispanic or Latino American of any race.

In 2000, the median income for a household in the city was $57,353, and the median income for a family was $77,252. Males had a median income of $52,295 versus $38,819 for females. The per capita income for the city was $39,113. About 3.0% of families and 4.5% of the population were below the poverty line, including 6.3% of those under age 18 and 4.8% of those age 65 or over. According to the 2020 American Community Survey, the median household income was $62,273 with a mean income of $91,293.

Education

Primary and secondary schools

Public schools
Pupils in Nassau Bay attend schools in Clear Creek Independent School District. The community is within the Board of Trustees District 2, represented by Win Weber as of 2008.

Pupils are zoned to Robinson Elementary School in Pasadena, Space Center Intermediate School (Houston), and Clear Creek High School (League City).

Prior to the 2006–2007 school year, Nassau Bay was zoned to Falcon Pass Elementary School (Houston).

Private schools
St. Thomas the Apostle Episcopal School, a private school, is located in Nassau Bay.

Colleges and universities
The portion of Clear Creek ISD in Harris County (and therefore Nassau Bay) is assigned to San Jacinto College.

Government and infrastructure
The United States Postal Service operates the Nassau Bay Post Office at 18214 Upper Bay Road. Nassau Bay postal addresses are designated as "Houston, Texas".

Harris Health System (formerly Harris County Hospital District) designated Strawberry Health Center in Pasadena for ZIP code 77058. The nearest public hospital is Ben Taub General Hospital in the Texas Medical Center.

Sister city
Nassau Bay is the sister city of Star City, Russia, the home of the Russian equivalent of the Johnson Space Center.

References

External links

 City of Nassau Bay official website
Nassau Bay – Handbook of Texas
G.W. Robinson Elementary School

Cities in Texas
Cities in Harris County, Texas
Galveston Bay Area
Greater Houston
Populated coastal places in Texas